Franz Schubert's compositions of 1811 are mostly in the Deutsch catalogue (D) range D 2–12, and include:
 Instrumental works:
 Symphony, D 2B
 Overture to the comedy Der Teufel als Hydraulicus, D 4
 Vocal music:
 Der Spiegelritter, D 11

Table

Legend

List

|-
| data-sort-value="996" | 996
| data-sort-value="002.1" | 2A
| data-sort-value="ZZZZ" |
| data-sort-value="ZZZZ" |
| data-sort-value="506,01" | V, 6 No. 1
| data-sort-value="Overture, D 002A" | Overture, D 2A
| data-sort-value="key D major" | D major
| data-sort-value="1811-01-01" | 1811?
| For orchestra
|-
| data-sort-value="997" | 997
| data-sort-value="002.2" | 2B
| data-sort-value="ZZZZ" |
| data-sort-value="ZZZZ" |
| data-sort-value="506,02" | V, 6 No. 2
| data-sort-value="Symphony, D 002B" | Symphony, D 2B
| data-sort-value="key D major" | D major
| data-sort-value="1811-01-01" | 1811?
| Adagio, Allegro con moto (fragment)
|-
| data-sort-value="998" | 998
| data-sort-value="002.3" | 2C
| data-sort-value="XXX,1978" | (1978)
| data-sort-value="ZZZZ" |
| data-sort-value="603,A1" | VI, 3Anh. No. 1
| data-sort-value="String Quartet, D 002C" | String Quartet, D 2C
| data-sort-value="key D minor F major" | D minor or F major
| data-sort-value="1811-01-01" | 1811?
| Fragment
|-
| data-sort-value="995" | 995
| data-sort-value="002.4" | 2D
| data-sort-value="XXX,1956" | (1956)(1970)
| data-sort-value="ZZZZ" |
| data-sort-value="609,00" | VI, 9
| data-sort-value="Minuets, 06, D 002D" | Six Minuets, D 2D
| data-sort-value="key I" | Various keys
| data-sort-value="1811-01-01" | 1811
| For winds; Nos. 1–2: piano version publ. in 1956; Nos. 4-6: sketches
|-
| data-sort-value="993" | 993
| data-sort-value="002.5" | 2E
| data-sort-value="ZZZZ" |
| data-sort-value="ZZZZ" |
| data-sort-value="724,00" | VII/2, 4
| data-sort-value="Fantasy, D 002E" | Fantasy, D 2E
| data-sort-value="key C minor" | C minor
| data-sort-value="1811-01-01" | 1811
| For piano
|-
| data-sort-value="999.00026" |
| data-sort-value="002.6" | 2F
| data-sort-value="ZZZZ" |
| data-sort-value="ZZZZ" |
| data-sort-value="609,00" | VI, 9
| data-sort-value="Trio, D 002F" | Trio, D 2F
| data-sort-value="ZZZZ" |
| data-sort-value="1811-01-01" | 1811
| For winds?; Sketch; Belongs to a lost Minuet
|-
| data-sort-value="999.00027" |
| data-sort-value="002.7" | 2G
| data-sort-value="ZZZZ" |
| data-sort-value="ZZZZ" |
| data-sort-value="506,03" | V, 6 No. 3
| data-sort-value="Overture, D 002G" | Overture, D 2G
| data-sort-value="key D major" | D major
| data-sort-value="1810-01-01" | 1810–1811?
| For orchestra; Fragment
|-
| data-sort-value="003" | 3
| data-sort-value="003" | 3
| data-sort-value="XXX,1978" | (1978)
| data-sort-value="ZZZZ" |
| data-sort-value="603,A2" | VI, 3Anh. No. 2
| data-sort-value="String Quartet, D 003" | String Quartet, D 3
| data-sort-value="key C major" | C major
| data-sort-value="1812-01-01" | 1812?
|-
| data-sort-value="004" | 4
| data-sort-value="004" | 4
| data-sort-value="XXX,1886" | (1886)
| data-sort-value="0200,001" | IINo. 1
| data-sort-value="505,01" | V, 5
| data-sort-value="Teufel als Hydraulicus, Der" | Overture to the play Der Teufel als Hydraulicus
| data-sort-value="theatre (Overture to a comedy with singing)" | (Overture to a comedy with singing)D major
| data-sort-value="1812-01-01" | 1812?
|-
| data-sort-value="005" | 5
| data-sort-value="005" | 5
| data-sort-value="XXX,1894" | (1894)
| data-sort-value="2001,001" | XX, 1No. 1
| data-sort-value="406,01" | IV, 6No. 1
| Hagars Klage
| data-sort-value="text Hier am Hugel heissen Sandes" | Hier am Hügel heißen Sandes
| data-sort-value="1811-03-30" | 30/03/1811
|-
| data-sort-value="006" | 6
| data-sort-value="006" | 6
| data-sort-value="XXX,1894" | (1894)
| data-sort-value="2001,002" | XX, 1No. 2
| data-sort-value="403,00" | IV, 3
| data-sort-value="Madchens Klage, Des, D 006" | Des Mädchens Klage, D 6
| data-sort-value="text Der Eichwald brauset 1" | Der Eichwald brauset
| data-sort-value="1811-01-01" | 1811–1812
| data-sort-value="Text by Schiller, Friedrich from Wallenstein: Die Piccolomini III, 7 Der Eichwald brauset 1" | Text by Schiller, from Wallenstein: Die Piccolomini III, 7 (other settings:  and 389)
|-
| data-sort-value="007" | 7
| data-sort-value="007" | 7
| data-sort-value="XXX,1894" | (1894)
| data-sort-value="2001,003" | XX, 1No. 3
| data-sort-value="406,02" | IV, 6No. 2
| Leichenfantasie
| data-sort-value="text Mit erstorbnem Scheinen" | Mit erstorbnem Scheinen
| data-sort-value="1811-01-01" | 1811?
| data-sort-value="Text by Schiller, Friedrich, Mit erstorbnem Scheinen" | Text by Schiller; reuses music of 
|-
| data-sort-value="008" | 8
| data-sort-value="008" | 8
| data-sort-value="XXX,1970" | (1970)
| data-sort-value="ZZZZ" |
| data-sort-value="602,01" | VI, 2 No. 1
| data-sort-value="Overture, D 008" | Overture, D 8
| data-sort-value="key C minor" | C minor
| data-sort-value="1811-06-29" | 29/6/1811
| For string quintet (two violins, two violas and cello); Music reappears in 
|-
| data-sort-value="999.00081" |
| data-sort-value="008.1" | 8A
| data-sort-value="XXX,1970" | (1970)
| data-sort-value="ZZZZ" |
| data-sort-value="603,03" | VI, 3 No. 3
| data-sort-value="Overture, D 008A" | Overture, D 8A
| data-sort-value="key C minor" | C minor
| data-sort-value="1811-07-13" | After12/7/1811
| For string quartet; Based on 
|-
| data-sort-value="009" | 9
| data-sort-value="009" | 9
| data-sort-value="XXX,1888" | (1888)
| data-sort-value="0903,031" | IX, 3No. 31
| data-sort-value="711,02" | VII/1, 1No. 2
| data-sort-value="Fantasy, D 009" | Fantasy, D 9
| data-sort-value="key G minor" | G minor
| data-sort-value="1811-09-20" | 20/9/1811
| For piano duet
|-
| data-sort-value="010" | 10
| data-sort-value="010" | 10
| data-sort-value="XXX,1894" | (1894)
| data-sort-value="2001,004" | XX, 1No. 4
| data-sort-value="406,03" | IV, 6No. 3
| data-sort-value="Vatermorder, Der" | Der Vatermörder
| data-sort-value="text Ein Vater starb von des Sohnes Hand" | Ein Vater starb von des Sohnes Hand
| data-sort-value="1811-12-26" | 26/12/1811
| data-sort-value="Text by Pfeffel, Gottlieb Konrad, Ein Vater starb von des Sohnes Hand" | Text by Pfeffel
|-
| data-sort-value="011" | 11966
| data-sort-value="011" | 11
| data-sort-value="XXX,1893" | (1893)(1897)
| data-sort-value="1507,012" | XV, 7No. 12XXI, 1No.1
| data-sort-value="211,00" | II, 11
| data-sort-value="Spiegelritter, Der" | Der Spiegelritter
| data-sort-value="theatre (Singspiel in 3 acts)" | (Singspiel in three acts)
| data-sort-value="1811-12-01" | December1811?
| data-sort-value="Text by Kotzebue, August von Spiegelritter, Der" | Text by Kotzebue; For ssssstttbbbbSATB and orchestra; Overture (publ. in 1897) – Nos. 1–8 (Act I, Nos. 2–3 and 8 are fragments, No. 3 not in AGA, part of No. 3 was )
|-
| data-sort-value="012" | 12
| data-sort-value="012" | 12
| data-sort-value="XXX,1897" | (1897)
| data-sort-value="2101,002" | XXI, 1No. 2
| data-sort-value="505,02" | V, 5
| data-sort-value="Overture, D 012" | Overture, D 12
| data-sort-value="key D major" | D major
| data-sort-value="1811-01-01" | 1811–1812
| For orchestra; Music partly reused in 
|}

Lists of compositions by Franz Schubert
Compositions by Franz Schubert
Schubert